The NWA Tennessee Southern Heavyweight Championship was a short-lived title in the National Wrestling Alliance that was defended in Southern Championship Wrestling. It existed from 1981 to 1982.

Title history

See also
List of National Wrestling Alliance championships
NWA Southern Heavyweight Championship (Florida version)
NWA Southern Heavyweight Championship (Georgia version)

References

External links
N.W.A. Southern Heavyweight Title (Knoxville)

National Wrestling Alliance championships
Heavyweight wrestling championships
Regional professional wrestling championships
Professional wrestling in Tennessee